Snakland is the third studio album by Bugskull, released in 1995 by Scratch Records.

Track listing

Personnel 
Adapted from the Snakland liner notes.

Bügsküll
Brendan Bell – bass guitar, production, engineering
Sean Byrne – lead vocals, guitar, production, engineering
James Yu – drums, design

Production and additional personnel
Cora Crory – photography, design
Mark Hansen – accordion (5)
Chris Willging – photography

Release history

References

External links 
 

1995 albums
Bugskull albums